Ultimate Daryl Hall + John Oates is a 2004 two-CD compilation album by Daryl Hall & John Oates, released by Sony BMG on their Heritage label. It charted at No. 63 on the Billboard 200, remaining in the charts for three weeks. The album was reissued the following year as The Essential Daryl Hall & John Oates.

Track listing

Charts

Certifications and sales

References

Hall & Oates compilation albums
2004 greatest hits albums
Legacy Recordings compilation albums